Tabrizicola aquatica is a Gram-negative, aerobic, rod-shaped and non-motile bacterium from the genus of Tabrizicola which has been isolated from the Qurugöl Lake near the city Tabriz in Iran.

References 

Rhodobacteraceae
Bacteria described in 2014